I Am... World Tour (sometimes referred to as the I Am... Tour) was the fourth concert tour by American singer-songwriter Beyoncé launched in support of her third studio album, I Am... Sasha Fierce (2008). The tour was announced in October 2008 embarked in March 2009 with five rehearsal shows in North America. The tour consisted of 110 shows in total, visiting the Americas, Europe, Asia, Africa, and Australia. Preparations for the shows began eight months prior to the beginning of the tour with twelve-hour rehearsals for two months. Knowles described the shows as her best and most theatrical from all of her tours.

The set list for the concerts included songs from Knowles' three studio albums as well as several covers of other artists and a Destiny's Child medley. The central theme of the tour was to showcase the difference between Knowles' dual personality; her emotional side and her onstage persona, Sasha Fierce which was also demonstrated in the dual album I Am... Sasha Fierce. The show featured two stages – the main one and a smaller B-stage where Knowles was transferred during the middle of the show. She was backed by an all-female band, female background dancers and a big LED screen. Thierry Mugler collaborated with Knowles on the costumes and had a creative advisor role further working on the choreography, lighting and production. Chris March made the costumes usable for stage and helped in their making. For the ballads, Knowles wore longer dresses while for the performances of the up-tempo songs, more make-up and more revealing outfits were worn. The fashion and Knowles' look and figure received praise from critics. The show was directed and choreographed by Frank Gatson Jr.

I Am... received acclaim from music critics who praised Knowles' performance abilities calling her the best female performer. A concert in Malaysia was cancelled by Knowles after several Muslim groups tried to ban it although she agreed to tone down her look according to the country's standards. The tour was commercially successful grossing $86.0 million from 93 shows in total. Separate performances of several songs were broadcast on different channels and two concerts were released as live albums; the live performance at the I Am... Yours revue was released in a CD/DVD format in 2009 and footage of the tour was released on the similarly titled live album in 2010.

Background

In 2006, during an interview with MTV News, Beyoncé introduced an aggressive alter ego, Sasha Fierce, which also served as her stage persona. She added that the persona is a complete opposite of her when not performing by characterizing her as "aggressive... strong... fearless." Beyoncé's third album I Am... Sasha Fierce introduced Sasha Fierce as her alter ego. she revealed that Sasha was born during the making of her single "Crazy in Love" (2003). The plans for a 2009 tour in support of the album were announced in October 2008 by Billboard magazine. The tour dates for the European leg were announced in December 2008. During an interview with Entertainment Weekly, Beyoncé confirmed that she would be backed by the all-female band which had also accompanied her for her previous The Beyoncé Experience tour (2007). Rehearsals for the tour lasted eight months during which the set list for the shows was also constructed. Beyoncé further revealed that the twelve-hour rehearsals for the tour included dancing the choreography in heels for two months before it commenced. During an interview, Beyoncé emphasized how she needed to prepare to channel her alter ego for the performances. According to Beyoncé, the shows were supposed to be a mixture of several of her musical preferences, including  jazz, hip-hop, ballet and fashion.

The tour kicked off in late-March 2009 with five rehearsal shows in North America. It officially commenced in late April 2009, at Arena Zagreb in Croatia later visiting six continents, namely the Americas, Europe, Asia, Africa, and Australia. The six-week North American leg of the I Am... tour kicked off on June 21 with a show at Madison Square Garden in New York and finished with a four-night residency at Encore in the Wynn Las Vegas from July 30, 2009 to August 2, 2009. The tour finished with a concert at Queen's Park Savannah in Port of Spain, Trinidad and Tobago, with 108 shows in total. Beyoncé and her organization, The Survivor Foundation, became the spokesperson for General Mills' Hamburger Helper campaign entitled, "Show Your Helping Hand". The campaign's mission was to provide more than 3.5 million meals to local food banks in North America. Knowles encouraged spectators to bring non-perishable foods to her North American concerts to be donated to the campaign. According to the campaign's official website, nearly three millions meals and over $50,000 have been donated.

Development

Beyoncé revealed that the hardest aspect of coming up with the tour's set list was managing to fit her decade-long song catalogue in a two-hour show. According to her, the tour was supposed to be more emotional than The Beyoncé Experience in order to reflect the "real[,] raw and more sensitive" nature of the I Am... portion of the double album. Beyoncé expressed frustration that snippets of the show appeared online after the first shows on the opening leg, thus "ruining" the surprise factor of the concert experience; however she also appreciated the fact that it can act as a "little sneak peek" for fans to decide if they indeed want to attend. French designer Thierry Mugler served as the creative advisor while also being responsible for Beyoncé's wardrobe. He contributed in the design of lighting, choreography, production and directed three sequences for the concert. According to his creative vision, the shows were intended to represent mise-en-scène by incorporating technical aspects with fashion in order to capture the emotions behind the songs. He added, "There will be a lot of dramatization and metamorphosis on stage. Some very strong effects have been inspired directly by Beyoncé, and only she could make [them] happen on stage."

Onstage, Beyoncé was backed by her ten-piece all-female band, Suga Mama, which included two drummers, two keyboardists, a percussionist, a horn section, three backup vocalists called the Mamas, and a lead guitarist. The show featured two stages, namely a simple main stage with a pop0up set of stairs, an LED background screen, and glass risers for Suga Mama and The Mamas as well as a smaller B-stage in the midst of the audience for the later portions of the show. During the concerts, Beyoncé went through six costume changes; during the breaks, The Mamas harmonized. The set list included songs from all of Beyoncé's three studio albums that had been published, a Destiny's Child medley and several covers of other artists. Several critics noted that the songs on the set list were divided into ballads and more up-tempo songs to coincide with the central theme of I Am... Sasha Fierce – the dual personality of Beyoncé. Beyoncé's costumes were changed in order to coincide with the songs' nature; during performances of ballads, she wore longer white dresses while for the uptempo songs, she had more revealing outfits and make-up.

Fashion

Thierry Mugler served as the main costume designer for the tour. Beyoncé was acquainted to and enraptured by his work at the Metropolitan Museum of Art Costume Institute Gala, titled "Superheroes, Fashion and Fantasy" (2008) where she saw several of his haute couture pieces that were on display. Beyoncé discussed the possibility of using the costumes with Tina Knowles. She met with Mugler in Paris in September of the same year and started exchanging ideas for costume designs and the following month he was contracted as the designer for the tour. While designing, the main concept Mugler wanted to illustrate was the duality between "being a woman and a warrior" through his own creative perception; the words "Feminine. Free. Warrior. Fierce" were the overarching inspiration. He felt, "Sasha Fierce is another aspect of Beyoncé's personality, she is Fierce on stage and Beyoncé in real life... Beyoncé is a very sophisticated 'stage animal', which means that she is truly instinctive. Beyoncé expresses herself through the two aspects of her personality." Furthermore, the elaborate costumes were related to the meanings of the songs performed.

A seventy one piece wardrobe was designed for Beyoncé and her dancers and band. For the shows, Beyoncé adopted ten different looks. American fashion designer Chris March also worked with Mugler ensuring the costumes were suitable for stage purposes. On July 23, 2009, March filed a lawsuit against Mugler for allegedly not paying him for the work he did on the wardrobe. Metal pieces, fishnets, gloves, power shoulders and golden leotards were all incorporated in the costumes, the majority of which were form-fitting and exposed the singer's legs. Michael Quintanilla of San Antonio Express-News thought the fashion was akin to a "high-tech Blade Runner world". For the performance of several songs, Beyoncé also wore leopard-print pants and glow-in-the-dark bra with a blinking beacon affixed to her body.

The fashion and Beyoncé's look during the shows received praise from critics. Randall King of the Winnipeg Free Press noted that the fashion was inspired by "1970s space movie" fashion by Bob Mackie. Alice Jones of The Independent noted: "[the list of] 30 songs introduces us to any number of different Beyoncés – showgirl, balladeer, feminist, rock chick, gangster queen, cyborg – via off-stage costume changes and a leotard for every mood". Kathy McCabe of The Daily Telegraph noted that the shows featured "some of the most elaborate and revealing costumes of her career" thus far. A writer of the Evening Chronicle wrote that the sparkling outfits managed to capture the singer's personality with looks ranging from "NYPD cop to bride to Wonderwoman and beyond" all the while emphasizing her physique. Holly Burnes of The Daily Telegraph also praised the fashion writing that the singer's look included "one incredible costume after another: from a Mad Max look... to an angelic wedding dress Jay Hanna of The Sunday Times compared Beyoncé's look to a goddess, particularly with the costume she wore for "Single Ladies (Put a Ring on It)".

Concert synopsis

The show started with Beyoncé's silhouette appearing on a smoky stage, walking towards the front while singing several lines of "Déjà Vu". Dressed in a gold leotard and stilettos, she was quickly joined by two dancers in catsuits proceeding to perform "Crazy in Love"; during the performance of the song glitter and confetti were dropped on stage. "Naughty Girl" was performed next as bright orange lights were displayed on stage. For the performance of "Freakum Dress", Beyoncé was accompanied by a guitarist onstage, bending backwards during the song's bridge. "Get Me Bodied" followed, for which the singer was engaging in elaborate dance routines with her background dancers. Following a short break, Beyoncé proceeded singing songs from the I Am... portion of the album, dressed in a white leotard. "Smash Into You" was performed on top of a flight of stairs. For "Ave Maria", her background dancers turned her white dress into a wedding gown by attaching a veil to her head. Excerpts of Sarah McLachlan's "Angel" and Franz Schubert's Ave Maria" were performed at the end. She continued on to sing "Broken-Hearted Girl" wearing a white bustier with a sheer, flowing wrap. Outtakes from the music video of "If I Were a Boy" were Beyoncé appeared to perform the aforementioned song dressed as a cop wearing Ray-Bans and  a leather breastplate. Excerpts from Alanis Morissette's "You Oughta Know" and Tupac Shakur's "California Love" were incorporated in the middle of the song. A video interlude directed by Melina Matsoukas was shown set to "Sweet Dreams". The video showed a robotic Beyoncé interacting with a cheetah as a mechanical voice intoned Sasha Fierce. Beyoncé then appeared on stage dressed in a leopard-print leotard to perform "Diva". She appeared at the top of the staircase with her backup female dancers; a video interlude showing a five-year old Beyoncé singing and dancing was shown in the middle of the song. She then sang "Radio" while the clip of her dancing as ac child was still projected on the screen. "Me, Myself and I" was introduced with a brief speech about female empowerment. "Ego" and "Hello" were performed afterwards. 

The show continued with a short medley performed by her backup singers, The Mamas, followed by another video interlude, featuring Sasha Fierce. Beyoncé appeared on stage after a gong bang; she was lifted out of a 20-foot train by a harness and performed "Baby Boy" while high-stepping and front-flipping above the audience. She was then lowered to the B-stage where she finished the song and continued with a cover Dawn Penn's "You Don't Love Me (No, No, No)". A stripped-down version of "Irreplaceable" was sung afterwards with frequent crowd interactions. Beyoncé then continued with "Check On It" and a medley of Destiny's Child hits including "Bootylicious", "Jumpin' Jumpin'", "Independent Women", "Bills, Bills, Bills" and "Survivor". Performances of "Upgrade U" and "Video Phone" followed. For the performance of the two songs, Beyoncé was accompanied by two female dancers and three male dancers, one of whom recorded a live stream of her with a camera throughout the routine during the performance of the latter song. This was followed by a rendition of "Say My Name" where she interacted with members of the audience, asking them to say her name. The concert followed back at the main stage where for the penultimate section, Beyoncé appeared wearing a gown and singing "At Last". A footage of her performance of the song at Barack Obama's inauguration as President of the United States, video images of civil rights era footage and snippets from her performance of the song in the movie, Cadillac Records (2008) were shown on the screen behind here. "Listen" was performed afterwards. This was followed by a YouTube video interlude featuring imitations of the choreography of "Single Ladies (Put a Ring on It)" performed by fans as well as Barack Obama and Justin Timberlake. Beyoncé then performed the song's trademark choreography accompanied by two female back-up dancers. For the finale, an extended version of "Halo" was performed while the singer descended from the stage to shake hands with fans in the front rows. She then went to the top of the staircase and repeatedly said "I am", awaiting the crowd to say it back. The letters "I am... yours" were displayed on the screen as she exited the stage.

Critical response

The tour received rave reviews from critics. Mike Ross of the website Jam! rated Beyoncé's performance with 4.5 out of 5 stars, praising the "high-production", the singer's wide vocal range and her "riveting presence". Stephanie Classen of The Star Phoenix remarked, "Beyoncé doesn't really need the bells and whistles of a big stadium show, but it sure makes for an unforgettable concert." Randall King of the Winnipeg Free Press graded the tour 4 stars out of 5 and praised the "back and forth" switch between the double persona throughout the show with the singer exhibiting both "raw energy" and "feeling"-induced ballads. Alice Jones of The Independent emphasized how the singer managed to "sing her heart out" in various musical styles that characterize the show's songs while further praising the energetic choreography and the vocals that range from "caramel smooth to honeyed foghorn". She concluded her review by saying, "Watching Beyoncé sing and strut her stuff can feel at best overawing, at worst, alienating".

Ben Ratliff of The New York Times observed that the show would make spectators question themselves how the singer managed to put on a "dazzling show" both physically and organizationally; he further praised the singer's "hollering voice, her imperious movement, her costume changes and the show's crush of concepts with their long tails of reference". Deborah Mcaleese and Lauren Mulvenny of The Belfast Telegraph described the show as "incredible... mind blowing... [and] electrifying".  A writer of Evening Chronicle wrote that the show's set abounded with "bling, glamour and, most importantly, enthusiasm", further praising her for the well-coordinated balance between "hit[ting] every note" and following elaborate choreographies. Jay Hanna of The Sunday Times felt that the show's encore ("Halo") was the most memorable moment of the set. She also praised the singer's "enviable" dancing skills, "spectacular production and audio visuals" but noted that some songs "let down" the performance by being less melodic. Jay Lustig of The Star-Ledger described the show as a "bona fide pop spectacle" with futuristic themes throughout. Jim Farber from the Daily News viewed the tour as "a huge upgrade in charm, humor and chops" as compared to The Beyoncé Experience and added that "Beyoncé's presence punctuated her singing like an exclamation point".

Describing the show as simultaneously "spellbinding, exhausting to watch and hugely slick", Michael Cragg of musicOMH noted that the highlights included songs from the Sasha Fierce half of the album. Caryn Ganz of Rolling Stone magazine praised the show, lauding the singer for her work ethic and the ability to execute singing, dancing and posing at the same time. Jayson Rodriguez of MTV News, commented "Through six outfit changes, bombastic ballads, high-energy singles and a daring high-wire journey from the stage to the center of the arena, Beyoncé delivered over and over again." A writer of Billboard magazine noted that Knowles "brought all the fierceness" on stage for the tour. The Australians Patrick Emery noted that Knowles showcased her self-assurance and professionalism in "full view". Comparing her performance with Michael Jackson's live shows, Renee Michelle Harris of the South Florida Times writes, "[Knowles] owns the stage with her trademark swagger and intensity... showcasing her powerful vocals without missing a note, often while engaged in vigorous, perfectly executed dance moves". Holly Burnes of The Daily Telegraph noted that the performance was almost inimitable and added "Whether crumping, sweeping across the stage in towering heels, or simply standing still, Beyonce was dynamite, blasting the benchmark for concert performers forever".

Simon Colling from The West Australian described the performance as "powerhouse" and added, "Beyonce's high-energy, high-voltage mix of song (loud, commercial R&B) and dance recalled names like Tina Turner, Aretha Franklin and rapper Missy Elliott... [and] Mariah Carey". Joanna Horowitz of The Seattle Times noted that despite the inclusion of almost 10 different musical styles in the show's set list, the singer's "own [musical] signature" and focus were lacking. Nevertheless, Horowitz praised the singer's performing skills and summarized the concert as "a hip-hop Cirque du Soleil — sequins galore, dramatic dance numbers, and Beyoncé at one point soaring". The Observers Barbara Ellen wrote, "she is a force of nature – delivering one of the most enjoyable well-paced shows I've seen in years". However, she noted that Knowles is "so steeped in professionalism that what should be magical can become mechanical." Noting influences by Tina Turner and Barbra Streisand during the tour, Ann Powers of Los Angeles Times writes: "And she danced like only Beyonce can dance, with a combination of power, grace and smarts that fully unites Broadway choreography with urban street innovations ... Indeed, her production can be seen as a retelling of pop's history from a feminine viewpoint -- and as an argument for Beyonce as the ultimate realization of the female pop dream."

Ben Ratliff of The New York Times summarized the tour's concept as "the duality of well-meaning good girl and rapacious animal-robot-dance-titan." Jay Lustig of The Star-Ledger concluded that the album's split personality was reflected in the show naturally enough. However, Barbara Ellen of The Observer wrote, "Another irritant is the much-trumpeted 'duality' nonsense with Sasha Fierce, Beyoncé's alter-ego for her latest album. All 'Sasha' does here is flail about in a video, no different from regular Beyoncé, except for a gold dress and a hairdo that veers dangerously towards Liberace." Similarly, Ann Powers from the Los Angeles Times wrote that the only thing which was not fully realized was the show's "overarching" theme, "Beyonce meant to represent herself as a split personality, tender and open on the one hand, indomitable and rather scary on the other. But Beyonce has chosen the wrong dichotomy to represent herself."

Commercial performance
Tickets for the American leg of the tour were available for pre-sale for members of Knowles' fan club on April 20, 2008 and the official tickets went on sale to the general public through Ticketmaster on April 25. In late May 2009, Knowles' label announced through a press release that the singer decided to set aside 2,000 seats for each date on her then-forthcoming North American tour at a discounted price of $20. After already selling 1,000 tickets per show for the special low price, the last 1,000 discounted seats for each show were made available to the public on May 29, 2009 through Ticketmaster (with the exception of the artist's four-night residency at the Encore at Wynn Las Vegas). Due to the big demand, Sony Music announced additional dates in England, Asia and South America. In May 2009, Knowles' official website was peppered with requests by disappointed fans — from Boston; Anchorage, Alaska; Tampa, Florida; St. Louis and Montreal — who asked from her to come to their towns. Knowles broke her record of concert attendees by selling out the Morumbi Stadium in São Paulo, Brazil, with over 60,000 tickets sold. It was reported to Billboard that as of September 16, 2009, from the 53 shows, Knowles grossed $53.5 million and drawn 667,509 fans from the mostly 15,000-seat arenas. In 2009, the tour was nominated for Eventful Fans' Choice Award at the 6th Annual Billboard Touring Awards. The tour grossed $86 million from 93 concert shows and 108 show total grossed $119,5 million.

Controversy in Malaysia

In September 2009, it was announced by the Associated Press that Knowles would be bringing her show to Kuala Lumpur, Malaysia on October 25, 2009, but it would be without some of her usual tricks. After encountering what became familiar opposition from religious groups in a predominantly Muslim country, Knowles agreed to tone down some parts of her act. A spokesperson for the Pan-Malaysian Islamic Party stated: "We are against Western sexy performances; we don't think our people need that." However, a rep soon came from the concert's Malaysian organizer, stating that "all parties have reached an amicable understanding" about the performance. He went on saying that Knowles should be regarded as a "role model" and an "embodiment of success" because of her philanthropic work, including campaigns against poverty and domestic violence. The Marctensia promoter further told the Associated Press: "We are confident that Beyoncé's concert will once and for all silence international critics and put Malaysia back on track and move up the ranks in presenting A-list international pop concerts in this region and further boost tourism."

However, it was ultimately announced in October 2009 that the concert has been postponed in the wake of accusations by Islamic conservatives that the show would be "immoral and unclean". Malaysian promoter Marctensia said in a statement that the show has been postponed to a future date to be announced shortly, and added "The postponement is solely [the] decision of the artist and has nothing to with other external reasons." Another representative declined to comment on whether the show was postponed due to the heavy criticism it was receiving from religious leaders in the country. The show also faced oppositions by Islamic conservatives in Egypt who branded it as an "insolent sex party" that threatens the Muslim nation's "social peace and stability" and tried to encourage people against going to the concert. Two years prior to the performance, Knowles scheduled a show in Malaysia but backed out due to similar protests regarding her performance.

Recordings and broadcasts

While the singer was on tour, she was asked to perform a Las Vegas residency-type of show. Knowles and her team produced the shows in seven days and entitled it I Am... Yours. She performed an unplugged, acoustic styled show different from the rest of her tour, at the Encore Theater in Las Vegas. The show on August 2, 2009 was recorded and later released as a DVD, audio CD and television special in late November 2009 titled I Am... Yours: An Intimate Performance at Wynn Las Vegas. The DVD was commercially successful peaking at number one on the Nielsen SoundScan Music DVD chart. It was certified double platinum by the Recording Industry Association of America (RIAA). Another live CD/DVD of the tour was released as I Am... World Tour in late November 2010. The album contained performances from different stops of the tour blended with personal footage of Knowles' backstage work and thoughts about the tour and her life. It served as the directorial debut for Knowles. The DVD was commercially successful becoming the best selling DVD in the world in 2010.

Parts of the show in Vancouver on March 31, 2009 were recorded and have been used for commercial use, as well as photos from the show used in the official tour book and other promotional items. "If I Were A Boy" and "Single Ladies (Put a Ring on It)" from the show in New Orleans were recorded and shown on TV One as a part of the Essence Music Festival in 2009. A CD and DVD, released on June 15, 2010, featured her performance of "Single Ladies (Put a Ring on It)". "Crazy In Love", "Freakum Dress", "Get Me Bodied", "Smash Into You" and "Broken-Hearted Girl" from the show in Donetsk, Ukraine, were recorded professionally and shown on TRK Ukraina as part of their footage of the Donbass Arena opening. "Crazy In Love" and "Single Ladies" were professionally recorded at the Summer Sonic Festival in Osaka, Japan and used to promote Knowles' Japanese tour. "Crazy In Love" and "Naughty Girl" were also professionally recorded at the 2009 Singapore Grand Prix F1 Rocks event in Singapore for Channel HD 5 Live coverage. "Crazy In Love" was recorded professionally and shown on Frecuencia Latina from the show in Lima, Peru at the Explanada del Estadio Monumental.

Opening acts
RichGirl (North America)
Flo Rida (Australia)
Eva Avila (Canada)
Linda Teodosiu (Austria, Germany and Switzerland)
Ildiko Keresztes and Karmatronic (Hungary)
Marek Ztracený (Czech Republic)
Humphrey (France)
DJ Lester & Abdou (Belgium)
Miguel Simões and Verinha Mágica (Portugal)
Labuat (Barcelona)
Shontelle (England and Ireland)
Jessica Mauboy (Australia)
Zarif (England and Ireland)
Ádammo (Peru)
Ivete Sangalo (Brazil)
Wanessa (Brazil)

Set list
The following set list is representative of the show on June 21, 2009. It is not representative of all concerts for the duration of the tour.

"Crazy in Love"
"Naughty Girl"
"Freakum Dress"
"Get Me Bodied"
"Smash Into You" 
"Ave Maria" / "Angel"
"Broken-Hearted Girl"
"If I Were a Boy" / "You Oughta Know"
"Diva"
"Radio"
"Me, Myself and I"
"Ego"
"Hello"
"Baby Boy"
"Irreplaceable"
"Check on It"
Destiny's Child Medley: "Bootylicious" / "Bug a Boo" / "Jumpin', Jumpin'"
"Upgrade U"
"Video Phone"
"Say My Name"
"At Last"
"Listen"
"Single Ladies (Put a Ring on It)"
"Halo"

Notes
As the grand opening of Donetsk's new sporting arena, the Donbass Arena drew near, it was announced by local organizers that Knowles' will perform as part of her tour. The ceremony involved a dance production dedicated to Ukraine's miners. Local artists Natal'ya Mogilevskaya, Svetlana Loboda and Aliona Vinnitskaya performed Queen's "We Will Rock You". Afterwards, a speech by Victor Yushchenko, president of Ukraine was given. Knowles performed audience of nearly 45,000.
On June 09, 2009, Knowles was joined by George Michael on stage for the performance of "If I Were a Boy".
On June 22, 2009, Jay-Z appeared on stage with Knowles in the middle of "Crazy in Love" and rapped a verse from his song "I Just Wanna Love U (Give It 2 Me)".
On July 3, 2009, during the Essence Music Festival, Knowles dedicated the performance to Michael Jackson following his death. A video of Knowles at the age five was projected on the screen showing her doing an impression of the artist. Knowles said, "That's when I decided who I wanted to be", stating that Jackson was responsible for the inspiration. She went on to sing "Halo" dedicating the lyrics to Jackson.
On July 16, 2009, Solange Knowles appeared as a special guest during the show which was aimed to benefit the Charles & Phyllis Newman Foundation and Knowles' charitable organization, The Survivor Foundation.
On November 15, 2009, Knowles was joined on stage by Kanye West who performed "Ego", and Jay-Z who rapped his verse on "Crazy in Love".

Shows

Cancelled shows

Personnel
Personnel adapted as per the I Am... concert booklet and live performance DVD.

Lead Vocals
Beyoncé Knowles - main artist, lead singer, lead vocals

Creative Direction
Beyoncé and Frank Gatson – show direction, staging, choreography
Thierry Mugler – creative advisor, costume designer
Kim Burse – creative director
Tina Knowles – creative consultant, stylist
Ty Hunter – stylist

Suga Mama Band
Bibi McGill – music director, guitar
Divinity Walker Roxx – music director, bass
Rie Tsuji – assistant music director, keyboards
Brittani Washington – keyboards
Marcie Chapa – percussion
Nikki Glaspie – drums
Kim Thompson – drums
Crystal Torres – trumpet
Tia Fuller – alto saxophone
Katty Rodriguez-Harrold – tenor saxophone

The Mamas (Background Vocalists):
Montina Cooper - background singer
Crystal A. Collins - background singer
Tiffany Moníque Riddick - background singer
Choreographers
Beyoncé
Frank Gatson Jr.
Jaquel Knight

Assistant Choreographers
Dana Foglia – dance swing
Christopher (Kriyss) Grant
Rosero McCoy
Kobi Rozenfeld
Tony Michales
Derrel Bullock
Bryan Tanaka
Sheryl Murakami
Rhapshody James
Cliff McGhee
Benny Andrews
Jonte Moaning
Ramon Baynes

Dancers
Ashley Everett – female dance captain
Tuere Tanee McCall (Left After North American Leg)
Ashley Seldon
Saidah Fishenden
Kimberly Gipson
Bryan Tanaka – male dance captain
Cassidy Noblett
Khasan Brailsford
Shaun Walker

Security
Julius DeBoer – head security for Beyoncé
Colin McNish – security for Beyoncé
Terrill Eastman – head of venue security
Bob Fontenot – venue security

Tour Management
Alan Floyd – tour manager
Marlon Bowers – assistant tour manager
Larry Beyince – tour assistant
Daniel Kernan – tour accountant
Josh Katzman – tour accountant

Tour Sponsors
MTV Europe – Europe/United Kingdom/Ireland
Trident – United Kingdom & Ireland
Nintendo – United Kingdom & Europe
L'Oréal Paris – North America
General Mills – North America
Crystal Geyser – Japan
Nestlé – South America
bMobile – Trinidad

Tour Promoters
AEG Live – United Kingdom
Live Nation & Haymon Concerts – North America & Europe
Michael Coppel Presents – Australia
Music World Entertainment – Worldwide
Aiken Promotions – Ireland

Notes

References

External links

Beyoncé Knowles' official website

2009 concert tours
2010 concert tours
Beyoncé concert tours
Concert tours of North America
Concert tours of the United States
Concert tours of Canada
Concert tours of Europe
Concert tours of the United Kingdom
Concert tours of France
Concert tours of Germany
Concert tours of Ireland
Concert tours of Oceania
Concert tours of Australia
Concert tours of South America
Concert tours of Asia
Concert tours of South Korea
Concert tours of Japan
Concert tours of Africa